This is a list of nations that have participated in the Commonwealth Games between 1930 and 2018. Participation in the Games is limited to member states of the Commonwealth of Nations and their territories. Although there are 56 members of the Commonwealth of Nations, 72 teams currently participate in the Commonwealth Games as a number of dependent territories compete under their own flags. The four Home Nations of the United Kingdom (England, Scotland, Wales and Northern Ireland) also send separate teams.

Only six teams have attended every Commonwealth Games: Australia, Canada, England, New Zealand, Scotland and Wales. The only Commonwealth members to have never taken part are Gabon and Togo, both of which joined the organisation in June 2022.

List of nations

This list includes all 72 current CGAs as well as a number of obsolete CGAs, arranged alphabetically. The three-letter country code is also listed for each CGA. Several nations have changed during the Games' history; name changes are explained by footnotes after the nation's name, and other notes are explained by footnotes linked within the table.

Table legend

Alphabetical list

Notes

Name change notes

Participation notes

See Also

Member states of the Commonwealth of Nations
List of CGF country codes
List of participating nations at the Summer Olympic Games
List of participating nations at the Winter Olympic Games

References

Sources

 

participating nations
Nations at the Commonwealth Games
participating nations